Kent Sidney Gilbert (born May 25, 1952, in Idaho, United States) is an American commentator and tarento working in Japan, lawyer of California. He first came to Japan in 1971 as a Mormon missionary. After returning to the United States, he received a Juris Doctor as well as an M.B.A. from Brigham Young University.  

While working in Japan as an attorney in 1983, he had a chance to perform as a stand-in for a foreign theatrical company, which led to other opportunities on Japanese television and in films. He is a foreign celebrity (gaijin tarento) and is often on news programs as a commentator with a "foreign" point of view. He is known as one of "the two Kents" (along with Kent Derricott).

Gilbert lives in Tokyo and also maintains a residence in Orem, Utah. He made an appearance in Kazuki Ōmori's Godzilla vs. King Ghidorah.

Gilbert maintains the Japanese government never forced women to work as prostitutes or comfort women during World War II.

In April 2018, Gilbert was appointed visiting professor at Okayama University of Science.

References

External links
 
 Gilbert, Kent S. 1952- in libraries (WorldCat catalog)
 
 
 You Are Going To Know? (blog, last update Aug. 25, 2017)

1952 births
Living people
20th-century Mormon missionaries
American expatriates in Japan
American lawyers
Latter Day Saints from Utah
American Mormon missionaries in Japan
Brigham Young University alumni
Expatriate television personalities in Japan
Nanjing Massacre deniers
People from Orem, Utah